Acropteris is a genus of moths of subfamily Microniinae of family Uraniidae. The genus was erected by Carl Geyer in 1832. The species of this genus are found in tropical Asia, Africa and Australia.

Description 
Palpi slender, upturned, and reaching vertex of head; antennae of male thickened and flattened. Fore wing with the costa arched, the apex acute, the outer margin straight; veins 3 and 4 from angle of cell in female; male with veins 2 and 3 stalked, 4 remote from 5, and the discocellulars distorted, 6 and 7 stalked; 8, 9, 10 stalked. Hind wing with the costa much lobed at base; veins 3 and 4 from angle of cell.

Species
Acropteris basiguttaria Walker
Acropteris ciniferaria (Walker, 1866) - Eastern Asia
Acropteris costinigrata Warren, 1897 - West Africa
Acropteris grammearia Geyer, 1832 - East Asia
Acropteris hypocrita Snellen, 1872 - DR Congo
Acropteris illiturata Warren, 1897 - East Africa
Acropteris inchoata (Walker, 1862)
Acropteris insticta Warren, 1897 - Madagascar
Acropteris iphiata (Guenée, 1857) - East Asia, Japan
Acropteris leptaliata (Guenée, 1857) - Taiwan
Acropteris mendax Snellen, 1872 - DR Congo
Acropteris munda Warren
Acropteris nanula Warren, 1898 - Australia
Acropteris nigrisquama Warren, 1897 - Nigeria
Acropteris parvidentata Warren
Acropteris puellaria (Walker, 1866) - Timor
Acropteris quadripunctata (Warren, 1896) - Australia
Acropteris rectinervata Guenée - Malaya, Borneo
Acropteris reticulata Warren, 1897
Acropteris rhibetaria Poujade
Acropteris sparsaria Walker - Taiwan
Acropteris striataria (Clerck, 1764)
Acropteris tenella Walker - India
Acropteris teriadata (Guenée, 1857) - Australia
Acropteris vacuata Warren, 1897 - Madagascar

References 

Uraniidae